Whickham School is a coeducational secondary school and sixth form located in Whickham (near Newcastle upon Tyne) in Tyne and Wear, England.

Formerly Whickham Comprehensive School, it opened in 1962 as a replacement for the small, 'all-age' Victorian school in the village centre. A much larger school was required due to the large house-building programme that was taking place. It holds around 1700 pupils between the ages of 11-19 and has 300 members of staff. It offers a range of vocational and traditional qualifications at Key Stage 4 and 5, including GCSE, BTEC and A-Level.

School performance
The school has good academic achievement, and is the largest sixth form in Gateshead.

The last Ofsted inspection judged the school as Good with five areas of the school judged Outstanding.

The ‘Outstanding’ areas were:

1 - The quality of learning for pupils with special educational needs and /or disabilities and their progress
2 - The extent to which pupils feel safe
3 - Pupils’ attendance
4 - The effectiveness of care, guidance and support
5 - The effectiveness of partnerships in promoting wellbeing

Fire
On 21 March 2008, there was a fire which destroyed the staff room, library, two music rooms, sixth form common room and study area. New and improved Sixth Form facilities opened ready for the academic year beginning in September 2009.

Legal challenge to school uniform
In June 1999, University Professor Claire Hale took legal action against the School when they refused permission to allow her daughter to wear trousers. Amongst others, the Equal Opportunities Commission decided to back the case. On 24 February 2000 the school avoided a legal battle by announcing that, in future, girls would be able to wear trousers.

Notable Former Pupils
 Richard Brodie, footballer
 Beverley Fullen, former drummer in UK pop band Hepburn (band)
 Conor Newton, footballer
 Mark Stoneman, cricketer for Middlesex County Cricket Club and England

References

External links
 School website

Academies in Gateshead
Secondary schools in Gateshead